Central United Talmudical Academy of Monsey or Central UTA of Monsey (CUTAM) is a private Hasidic Jewish school, with separate boys' and girls' campuses, in Airmont, New York.

History
In 2017, the school had about 800 students. There were expansion plans to have a new  campus with a capacity about 2,000 students in 44 classrooms, with half of each student count being boys and girls, and with each gender's school building having  of space. CUTA purchased the ex-Camp Regesh site in August 2016 to be its new campus. By 2017 the boys' school remained in an off-site leased building while it had moved the girls' school to the new site. A group of residents in Airmont opposed the plans.

In November 2018 the school filed a federal lawsuit against the Village of Airmont, accusing it of wrongfully using building code and zoning rules against the school and against the Suffern Central School District for denying transportation to the school's disabled students. In 2020 Vincent Briccetti, a U.S. district court judge, ruled that the trial may proceed as he found enough evidence for such.

In 2019, the school administered the New York state standardized tests in reading and math to a thousand students, all of whom failed.

References

Further reading
 Central UTA Federal Complaint
 Airmont Suffern UTA Federal Lawsuit

External links
 Central United Talmudical Academy of Monsey

Jewish day schools in New York (state)
Schools in Rockland County, New York